SS Samaustral was a Liberty ship built in the United States during World War II. She was transferred to the British Ministry of War Transportation (MoWT) upon completion.

Construction
Samaustral was laid down on 16 March 1944, under a Maritime Commission (MARCOM) contract, MC hull 2356, by J.A. Jones Construction, Brunswick, Georgia; sponsored by Mrs. J.E. Wfird, and launched on 28 April 1944.

History
She was turned over to the British Ministry of War Transport, on 13 May 1944. On 23 April 1947, she was sold to J.& C. Harrison, Ltd., for commercial use.

References

Bibliography

 
 
 
 
 

 

Liberty ships
Ships built in Brunswick, Georgia
1944 ships
Liberty ships transferred to the British Ministry of War Transport